The 2016–17 season is Club Atlético River Plate's 6th consecutive season in the top-flight of Argentine football. The season covers the period from 1 July 2016 to 30 June 2017.

Season events
On June 29, Luciano Lollo signed a 4 years contract with River Plate, after the club bought him from Racing Club. The transfer was made for U$S3.5M.

On June 30, Enrique Bologna signed a contract with River Plate after quitting Gimnasia y Esgrima.

On July 8, Iván Rossi became part of the squad. River bought the player from Banfield for U$S3M.

On August 3, Arturo Mina signed a 4 year contract with River Plate. The club bought the 70% of the transfer for U$S2.47M.  

On September 28, River Plate presented a new kit (the fourth released in 2016), featuring black as main color, with diagonal red and white stripes. The design is a tribute to Ángel Labruna, one of the club's greatest idols.

Squad Summer

Squad Winter

Transfers

In Summer

Out Summer

In Winter

Out Winter

Loan In

Loan Out

Friendlies

Pre-season

Mid-season

Primera División

League table

Results by matchday

Copa Argentina

Copa Libertadores

Group 3

Final stages

The 2017 Copa Libertadores final stages were played from 4 July to 29 November 2017. A total of 16 teams competed in the final stages to decide the champions of the 2017 Copa Libertadores.

This matches are listed on the article 2017-18 Club Atlético River Plate season.

References

Club Atlético River Plate seasons
River Plate